Miguel García Serrano, O.S.A. (1569 – June 14, 1629) was a Roman Catholic prelate who served as the Archbishop of the Roman Catholic Archdiocese of Manila (1618–1629) and the Bishop of the Diocese of Nueva Segovia (1616–1618).

Biography
Miguel García Serrano was born in Chinchón, Spain and ordained a priest of the Order of Saint Augustine in 1592. On August 3, 1616, Pope Paul V appointed him Bishop of Nueva Segovia. In 1617, he was consecrated bishop by Juan Pérez de la Serna, Archbishop of México. On February 12, 1618, Pope Paul V appointed him Archbishop of Manila. During his episcopacy, Serrano ordained Augustin Tabuyo to the priesthood on December 18, 1621, likely making Tabuyo the first Filipino to become a priest on record. Serrano served as Archbishop until his death on June 14, 1629.

See also
Catholic Church in the Philippines

References

External links and additional sources
 (for Chronology of Bishops) 
 (for Chronology of Bishops) 

1569 births
1629 deaths
Bishops appointed by Pope Paul V
Roman Catholic archbishops of Manila
Augustinian bishops
17th-century Roman Catholic bishops in the Philippines
Roman Catholic bishops of Nueva Segovia

Roman Catholic Archdiocese of Manila